The 2000–01 season was the Persepolis's 10th season in the Azadegan League, and their 18th consecutive season in the top division of Iranian Football. They were also be competing in the Hazfi Cup and Asian Club Championship. Persepolis was captained by Ahmad Reza Abedzadeh.

Squad

Mid-season Transfers

Out

Technical staff

|}

Competitions

Overview

Azadegan League

Standings

Matches

Hazfi Cup 

Round of 16

Asian Club Championship

First round

Second round

Quarterfinals

West Asia

Semifinals

Third place match

Scorers

References

Persepolis F.C. seasons